Kohnstamm is a German Jewish surname. Notable people with the surname include:

 Oskar Kohnstamm (1871–1917), German neurologist and psychiatrist
 Kohnstamm's phenomenon, namesake neurophysiological phenomenon
 Max Kohnstamm (1914–2010), Dutch diplomat and historian
 Thomas Kohnstamm (born 1975), American writer

German-language surnames